Nigel Spikes (born October 18, 1989) is an American professional basketball player who plays for Rizing Zephyr Fukuoka of the Japanese B.League. He played college basketball for the Marshall Thundering Herd before playing professionally in Venezuela, Mexico, Canada, New Zealand and Japan. He has also played in the Florida Basketball Association and the NBA Development League.

Spikes survived a heart attack in 2013.

Gallery

College statistics

|-
| style="text-align:left;"| 2009–10
| style="text-align:left;"| Marshall
| 29 || 1 || 8.4 || .575 || .000 || .515|| 2.3 ||0.2 || 0.2 ||0.3 || 2.2
|-
| style="text-align:left;"| 2010–11
| style="text-align:left;"| Marshall
| 32 || 32 || 20.3 || .554 || .000 || .505|| 5.9 ||0.3  || 0.4 || 1.0 || 5.1
|-
| style="text-align:left;"| 2011–12
| style="text-align:left;"| Marshall
| 29 || 0 || 16.7 || .523 || .000 || .549|| 4.8 ||0.2  || 0.7 || 0.8 || 4.1
|-
| style="text-align:left;"| 2012–13
| style="text-align:left;"| Marshall
| 32 || 31 || 24.8 || .468 || .000 || .520|| 7.3 ||0.6  || 0.7 || 1.9 || 5.7
|-
|- class="sortbottom"
| style="text-align:center;" colspan=2| Career
| 122 || 64 || 17.8 || .518 || .000 || .519 || 5.2 || 0.3 ||0.5 || 1.0 || 4.3

Career statistics

Regular season 

|-
| align="left" | 2014–15
| align="left" | Halifax Rainmen
| 18 || 2 || 16.1 ||.560  || .000 || .639 || 5.00 ||0.28  ||0.50 ||1.56 || 7.78
|-
|align="left"  style="background-color:#afe6ba; border: 1px solid gray" |2015–16†
| align="left" | Sioux Falls Skyforce
| 39 || 0 || 11.1 ||.604  || .500 || .467 || 3.08 ||0.51  ||0.28 ||1.08 || 4.54
|-
| align="left" | 2015–16
| align="left" | Wellington Saints
| 1 || 0 || 11.5 ||.000  || .000 || .000 || 2.00 ||0.00  ||0.00 ||0.00 || 0.00
|-
| align="left" | 2016–17
| align="left" | Fukushima Firebonds
| 56 || 56 || 22.9 ||.505  || .231 || .556 ||9.9 ||1.1 ||1.4 ||1.8 || 12.6
|-
| align="left" | 2017–18
| align="left" | Akita Happinets
| 58 || 21 || 17.9 ||.600  || .333 || .409 ||7.0 ||1.1 ||1.2 ||0.8 || 8.6
|-
| align="left" | 2018–19
| align="left" | Tokyo Z
| 37 || 37 || 29.42 ||.524  || .500 || .572 ||11.6 ||2.2 ||1.62||1.97 || 14.1
|-
| align="left" | 2019–20
| align="left" | Okayama
| 19 || 19 || 33.5 ||.570  || .286 || .572 ||13.2 ||2.3 ||1.7||1.8 || 21.2
|}

Playoffs 

|-
|style="text-align:left;"|2014–15
|style="text-align:left;"|Halifax
|9 || ||15.3 || .500 || .000 || .667 || 5.0 || 0.3 || 0.6 || 1.3 || 7.1
|-
|style="text-align:left;"|2015–16
|style="text-align:left;"|Sioux Falls
| 3 || || 6.3 || .500 || .000 || .000 || 0.7 || 0.3 || 0.0 || 0.7 || 1.3
|-
|style="text-align:left;"|2017–18
|style="text-align:left;"|Akita
| 5 || 2 || 15.37 || .579 || .000 || .846 || 5.8 || 0.8 || 0.6 || 1.0 || 6.6
|-

Early cup games 

|-
|style="text-align:left;"|2017
|style="text-align:left;"|Akita
| 2 || 1 || 17.23 || .750 || .000 || .286 || 7.5 || 0.5 || 1.5 || 1.5 || 10.0
|-
|style="text-align:left;"|2018
|style="text-align:left;"|Tokyo Z
|2 || 1 || 27.01 || .455 || .000 || .600 || 13.0 || 1.0 || 0.5 || 1 || 13.0
|-

References

External links
RealGM stats
Stats in Japan

1989 births
Living people
Aisin AW Areions Anjo players
Akita Northern Happinets players
American expatriate basketball people in Canada
American expatriate basketball people in Japan
American expatriate basketball people in Mexico
American expatriate basketball people in New Zealand
American expatriate basketball people in Venezuela
American men's basketball players
Basketball players from Florida
Centers (basketball)
Earth Friends Tokyo Z players
Fukushima Firebonds players
Halifax Rainmen players
Marshall Thundering Herd men's basketball players
Power forwards (basketball)
Rizing Zephyr Fukuoka players
Sioux Falls Skyforce players
Sportspeople from Fort Lauderdale, Florida
Tryhoop Okayama players
Wellington Saints players